Ribes viscosissimum also known as sticky currant is a species of eudicot in the family Grossulariaceae (currant family). The species is native to North America. Pacific Northwest, Columbia Plateau, Great Plains, Great Basin, and southwest regions of western North America are native to this plant.

Description 
Besides mountain forests and streambanks, Ribes viscosissimum grows in sagebrush plateaus. It grows from one to two meters (40-80 inches) in height, with a stem covered in sticky glandular hairs but lacking spines or bristles.   It is resinous and fragrant. The leaves have thick, rough blades divided into three lobes with rounded, toothed tips, the lobes being approximately the same size rather than the middle lobe being larger than the others, as in some related species. Typically, the blades are 8 centimeters long, and the petioles are up to 10 centimeters (4 inches) long. Inflorescences consist of several blooms clustered together, either erect or drooping. The flowers have five whitish, green, or pink-tinged sepals that resemble a corolla at their tips, sometimes becoming reflexed. The stamens and stigmas are surrounded by whitish petals. Fruits are blue-black berries up to a centimeter in length. They are not edible.

Ecology 
There have been reports of the following animal species as pollinators of this plant species or its genus where they overlap in geographical range: Bombus vagans, Bombus bifarius, Bombus centralis, Bombus fervidus, Bombus flavifrons, Bombus huntii, Bombus melanopygus, Bombus mixtus, Bombus nevadensis, Bombus terricola, Bombus sitkensis, Bombus occidentalis.

Habitat 
The vegetation is moist to wet, with avalanche slopes and streams; montane, lower subalpine. Also, West-Side Forest, East-Side Forest and Moist Riverbanks.

Propagation 
As soon as the seeds are mature in the autumn, they should be sowed in a cool body. Prior to sowing, cold stratifying stored seed at -2 to 0 °C for 3 months is commonly advised. Under normal garage conditions, the seed can last for 17 years or longer. Prick out the seedlings pots as soon as they are large enough to handle and grow them on in a cold frame for their first winter, putting them out in late spring the following year. Half-ripe wood cuttings, 10 – 15 cm with a heel, July/August in a body. November through February, in a cold body or sheltered mattress outside, cuttings of mature timber from the current year's boom, preferably with a heel from the previous year's increase. Its tree is a huge plant with a single trunk that grows in girth with age and branches that is not precisely defined but often exceeds four meters in height (which also grow in circumference with age).

Flower and berries 
Flowering starts in early summer. They are perennial. They are also locally common. The flowers are bell-shaped, white to greenish yellow, and grow in clusters of 4-15 flowers. The berries are black, covered in bluish wax, and very gummy. At mid-to-high elevations, this plant grows along streambanks, in damp to dry woods. Plants in the Angiosperm - Flowering Dicot category have two embryonic leaves (dicotyledons). Beans, buttercups, oaks, sunflowers, and other dicotyledons are examples.

Species Status 
Common, widespread, and abundant (although it may be rare in parts of its range). Not vulnerable in most of its range. Exhibits an intermediate range of ecological tolerance, typifies a stable phase of a native community, and persists but does not thrive with some natural or human disturbance

Allergenicity 
Sticky Currant (Ribes viscosissimum) species have not been linked to any allergies.

Distribution 
R. viscosissimum was found in states of Idaho, Oregon and Washington in high quantity. In Oregon, they were found in Grant County. In a Strawberry Wilderness on Slide Basin trail #372 on lower switchback of trail to Slide Lake below ridge between Strawberry and Slide Basins. They were on a Elevation of 6620 ft. In Idaho they were found in Bonner County at Priest Lake State Forest, Selkirk Mountains, Laclede, Riley Creek Road, about 2.5 miles up Manley Creek Road. In Blaine County on trail to Amber Lakes from West Fork of North Fork of Big Wood River, north of Ketchum. In Caribou County at Caribou National Forest. Forest Road 95. From Hwy 34 drive up road 107 to Valley Creek. Along Forest Road 107 about 2.5 air miles SW of Stump Peak.

References

Sources
 Species was collected on June 16, 1806, along the Lolo Trail in Idaho, by William Clark and Meriwether Lewis during their famous expedition. It was later described and published in Fl. Amer. Sept. (Pursh) 163. 1814.
 ^ The Plant List, Ribes viscosissimum var. hallii (Jancz.) Jancz.
 ^ Calflora taxon report, University of California, Ribes viscosissimum Pursh, Sticky Current, Sticky flowering currant, sticky currant
 ^ Biota of North America Program 2014 county distribution map
 ^ SEINet, Southwestern Biodiversity, Arizona chapter
 ^ Flora of North America, Ribes viscosissimum
 ^ Pursh, Frederick Traugott 1813. Flora Americae Septentrionalis 1: 163–164 description in Latin, commentary in English

viscosissimum
Plants described in 1814
Flora of the Western United States
Flora of Western Canada
Flora without expected TNC conservation status